

Events

Pre-1600
 904 – The warlord Zhu Quanzhong kills Emperor Zhaozong, the penultimate emperor of the Tang dynasty, after seizing control of the imperial government.
1236 – The Samogitians defeat the Livonian Brothers of the Sword in the Battle of Saule.
1499 – The Treaty of Basel concludes the Swabian War.
1586 – The Battle of Zutphen is a Spanish victory over the English and Dutch.

1601–1900
1692 – The last hanging of those convicted of witchcraft in the Salem witch trials; others are all eventually released.  
1711 – The first attacks of the Tuscarora War begin in present-day North Carolina.
1761 – George III and Charlotte of Mecklenburg-Strelitz are crowned King and Queen, respectively, of the Kingdom of Great Britain.
1776 – Nathan Hale is hanged for spying during the American Revolution.
1789 – The office of United States Postmaster General is established.
  1789   – Battle of Rymnik: Alexander Suvorov's Russian and allied army defeats superior Ottoman Empire forces.
1792 – Primidi Vendémiaire of year one of the French Republican Calendar as the French First Republic comes into being.
1823 – Joseph Smith claims to have found the golden plates after being directed by God through the Angel Moroni to the place where they were buried.
1857 – The Russian warship Lefort capsizes and sinks during a storm in the Gulf of Finland, killing all 826 aboard.
1862 – A preliminary version of the Emancipation Proclamation is released by Abraham Lincoln.
1866 – The Battle of Curupayty is Paraguay's only significant victory in the Paraguayan War.
1885 – Lord Randolph Churchill makes a speech in Ulster in opposition to the Irish Home Rule movement.
1891 – The first hydropower plant of Finland was commissioned along the Tammerkoski rapids in Tampere, Pirkanmaa.
1892 – A locomotive shunting falls into a hole in the ground, leading to the burial of the locomotive.
1896 – Queen Victoria surpasses her grandfather King George III as the longest reigning monarch in British history.

1901–present
1910 – The Duke of York's Picture House opens in Brighton, now the oldest continually operating cinema in Britain.
1914 – A German submarine sinks three British cruisers over a seventy-minute period, killing almost 1500 sailors.
1919 – The steel strike of 1919, led by the Amalgamated Association of Iron and Steel Workers, begins in Pennsylvania before spreading across the United States.
1934 – The Gresford disaster in Wales kills 266 miners and rescuers.
1939 – World War II: A joint German–Soviet military parade in Brest-Litovsk is held to celebrate the successful invasion of Poland.
1941 – The Holocaust in Ukraine: On the Jewish New Year Day, the German SS murders 6,000 Jews in Vinnytsia, Ukraine. Those are the survivors of the previous killings that took place a few days earlier in which about 24,000 Jews were executed.
1948 – Gail Halvorsen officially starts parachuting candy to children as part of the Berlin Airlift.
  1948   – Israeli-Palestine conflict: The All-Palestine Government is established by the Arab League.
1957 – In Haiti, François Duvalier is elected president.
1960 – The Sudanese Republic is renamed Mali after the withdrawal of Senegal from the Mali Federation.
1965 – The Indo-Pakistani War of 1965 between India and Pakistan over Kashmir ends after the United Nations calls for a ceasefire.
1966 – Twenty-four people are killed when Ansett-ANA Flight 149 crashes in Winton, Queensland, Australia.
1975 – Sara Jane Moore tries to assassinate U.S. President Gerald Ford, but is foiled by the Secret Service.
1979 – A bright flash, resembling the detonation of a nuclear weapon, is observed near the Prince Edward Islands. Its cause is never determined.
1980 – Iraq invades Iran, sparking the nearly eight year Iran–Iraq War.
1991 – The Dead Sea Scrolls are made available to the public for the first time.
1993 – A barge strikes a railroad bridge near Mobile, Alabama, causing the deadliest train wreck in Amtrak history. Forty-seven passengers are killed.
  1993   – A Transair Georgian Airlines Tu-154 is shot down by a missile in Sukhumi, Georgia.
1995 – An E-3B AWACS crashes outside Elmendorf Air Force Base, Alaska after multiple bird strikes to two of the four engines soon after takeoff; all 24 on board are killed.
  1995   – The Nagerkovil school bombing is carried out by the Sri Lanka Air Force in which at least 34 die, most of them ethnic Tamil schoolchildren.
2006 – Twenty-three people were killed in a maglev train collision in Lathen, Germany.
2013 – At least 75 people are killed in a suicide bombing at a Christian church in Peshawar, Pakistan.

Births

Pre-1600
1013 – Richeza of Poland, Queen of Hungary (d. 1075)
1211 – Ibn Khallikan, Iraqi scholar and judge (d. 1282)
1373 – Thomas le Despenser, 1st Earl of Gloucester (d. 1400)
1515 – Anne of Cleves, Queen consort of England (d. 1557)
1547 – Philipp Nicodemus Frischlin, German philologist, mathematician, astronomer, and poet (d. 1590)
1593 – Matthäus Merian, Swiss-German engraver and cartographer (d. 1650)

1601–1900
1601 – Anne of Austria, Queen and regent of France (d. 1666)
1606 – Li Zicheng, Chinese emperor (d. 1645)
1680 – Barthold Heinrich Brockes, German poet (d. 1747)
1694 – Philip Stanhope, 4th Earl of Chesterfield, English politician, Lord Lieutenant of Ireland (d. 1773)
1715 – Jean-Étienne Guettard, French mineralogist and botanist (d. 1786)
1741 – Peter Simon Pallas, German zoologist and botanist (d. 1811)
1743 – Quintin Craufurd, Scottish author (d. 1819)
1762 – Elizabeth Simcoe, English-Canadian painter and author (d. 1850)
1765 – Paolo Ruffini, Italian mathematician and philosopher (d. 1822)
1788 – Theodore Hook, English composer and educator (d. 1841)
1791 – Michael Faraday, English physicist and chemist (d. 1867)
1806 – Bernardino António Gomes, Portuguese physician and naturalist (d. 1877)
1819 – Wilhelm Wattenbach, German historian and academic (d. 1897)
1829 – Tự Đức, Vietnamese emperor (d. 1883)
1833 – Stephen D. Lee, American general and academic (d. 1908)
1835 – Alexander Potebnja, Ukrainian linguist and philosopher (d. 1891)
1841 – Andrejs Pumpurs, Latvian soldier and poet (d. 1902)
1862 – Anastasios Charalambis, Greek lieutenant and politician, Prime Minister of Greece (d. 1949)
1868 – Louise McKinney, Canadian educator and politician (d. 1931)
1870 – Charlotte Cooper, English-Scottish tennis player (d. 1966)
  1870   – Arthur Pryor, American trombonist, composer, and bandleader (d. 1942)
1875 – Mikalojus Konstantinas Čiurlionis, Lithuanian painter and composer (d. 1911)
1876 – André Tardieu, French journalist and politician, 67th Prime Minister of France (d. 1945)
1878 – Shigeru Yoshida, Japanese politician and diplomat, 51st Prime Minister of Japan (d. 1967)
1880 – Christabel Pankhurst, English activist, co-founded the Women's Social and Political Union (d. 1958)
1882 – Wilhelm Keitel, German field marshal (d. 1946)
1883 – Ferenc Oslay, Hungarian-Slovene historian and author (d. 1932)
  1883   – Frank George Woollard, English engineer (d. 1957)
1885 – Gunnar Asplund, Swedish architect and academic, designed the Stockholm Public Library (d. 1940)
  1885   – Ben Chifley, Australian engineer and politician, 16th Prime Minister of Australia (d. 1951)
  1885   – Erich von Stroheim, Austrian-American actor, director, and screenwriter (d. 1957)
1887 – Bhaurao Patil, Indian educator and activist (d. 1959)
1889 – Hooks Dauss, American baseball player (d. 1963)
1891 – Alma Thomas, American painter and educator (d. 1978)
1892 – Billy West, American actor, director, and producer (d. 1975)
1894 – Elisabeth Rethberg, German soprano (d. 1976)
1895 – Paul Muni, Ukrainian-born American actor (d. 1967)
1896 – Uri Zvi Greenberg, Ukrainian-Israeli poet and journalist (d. 1981)
  1896   – Henry Segrave, American-English race car driver (d. 1930)
1899 – Elsie Allen, Native American Pomo basket weaver (d. 1990) 
1900 – Paul Hugh Emmett, American chemist and engineer (d. 1985)
  1900   – William Spratling, American-Mexican silversmith and educator (d. 1967)

1901–present
1901 – Nadezhda Alliluyeva, second wife of Joseph Stalin (d. 1932)
  1901   – Charles Brenton Huggins, Canadian-American physician and physiologist, Nobel Prize laureate (d. 1997)
1902 – John Houseman, Romanian-American actor and producer (d. 1988)
1905 – Haakon Lie, Norwegian lawyer and politician (d. 2009)
  1905   – Eugen Sänger, Czech-Austrian engineer (d. 1964)
1906 – Ilse Koch, German war criminal (d. 1967)
1907 – Maurice Blanchot, French philosopher and author (d. 2003)
  1907   – Philip Fotheringham-Parker, English race car driver (d. 1981)
  1907   – Hermann Schlichting, German engineer and academic (d. 1982)
1908 – Esphyr Slobodkina, Russian-American author and illustrator (d. 2002)
1909 – John Engstead, American photographer and journalist (d. 1983)
1910 – György Faludy, Hungarian poet and author (d. 2006)
1912 – Herbert Mataré, German physicist and academic (d. 2011)
  1912   – Martha Scott, American actress (d. 2003)
1913 – Lillian Chestney, American painter and illustrator (d. 2000)
1915 – Grigory Frid, Russian pianist and composer (d. 2012)
1918 – Hans Scholl, German activist (d. 1943)
  1918   – Henryk Szeryng, Mexican violinist and educator (d. 1988)
1920 – Eric Baker, English activist, co-founded Amnesty International (d. 1976)
  1920   – Anders Lassen, Danish-English soldier, Victoria Cross recipient (d. 1945)
  1920   – Bob Lemon, American baseball player and manager (d. 2000)
  1920   – William H. Riker, American political scientist and academic (d. 1993)
1921 – Will Elder, American illustrator (d. 2008)
1922 – David Sive, American environmentalist and lawyer (d. 2014)
1923 – Dannie Abse, Welsh physician, poet, and author (d. 2014)
1924 – Bernard Gauthier, French cyclist (d. 2018)
  1924   – Charles Keeping, English author and illustrator (d. 1988)
  1924   – Rosamunde Pilcher, English author (d. 2019)
  1924   – Charles Waterhouse, American painter, sculptor, and illustrator (d. 2013)
  1924   – J. William Middendorf, American soldier and politician, 14th United States Secretary of the Navy
  1924   – Ray Wetzel, American trumpet player and composer (d. 1951)
1925 – Virginia Capers, American actress and singer (d. 2004)
  1925   – Leila Hadley, American author (d. 2009)
1926 – Bill Smith, American clarinet player and composer (d. 2020)
1927 – Gordon Astall, English footballer and coach (d. 2020)
  1927   – Tommy Lasorda, American baseball player, coach, and manager (d. 2021)
1928 – Eric Broadley, English engineer and businessman, founded Lola Cars (d. 2017)
  1928   – James Lawson, American activist, author, and academic
  1928   – Eugene Roche, American actor (d. 2004)
  1928   – Johnny Valentine, American wrestler (d. 2001)
  1928   – Vitthalrao Gadgil, Indian politician (d. 2001)
1929 – Serge Garant, Canadian composer and conductor (d. 1986)
  1929   – Carlo Ubbiali, Italian motorcycle racer (d. 2020)
1930 – Joni James, American singer (d. 2022)
  1930   – T. S. Sinnathuray, Judge of the High Court of Singapore (d. 2016)
1931 – Fay Weldon, English author and playwright (d. 2023)
  1931   – George Younger, 4th Viscount Younger of Leckie, Scottish banker and politician, Secretary of State for Defence (d. 2003)
1932 – Algirdas Brazauskas, Lithuanian politician, 2nd President of Lithuania (d. 2010)
  1932   – Ingemar Johansson, Swedish boxer (d. 2009)
1933 – Leonardo Balada, Spanish-American composer and educator
  1933   – T. Cullen Davis, American businessman
  1933   – Carmelo Simeone, Italian-Argentinian footballer (d. 2014)
  1933   – Jesco von Puttkamer, German-American engineer (d. 2012)
1934 – Jack McGregor, American captain, lawyer, and politician
  1934   – Lute Olson, American basketball player and coach (d. 2020)
  1934   – T. Somasekaram, Sri Lankan geographer and politician, 37th Surveyor General of Sri Lanka (d. 2010)
1936 – Maurice Evans, English footballer and manager (d. 2000)
1936   – Robin Gammell, Candian actor
1937 – Don Rutherford, English rugby player (d. 2016)
1938 – Gene Mingo, American football player
1939 – Bogdan Baltazar, Romanian economist and engineer (d. 2012)
  1939   – Deborah Lavin, South African-English historian and academic 
  1939   – Gilbert E. Patterson, American bishop (d. 2007)
  1939   – Junko Tabei, Japanese mountaineer (d. 2016)
1940 – Anna Karina, Danish-French actress, director, and screenwriter (d. 2019) 
1941 – Jeremiah Wright, American pastor and theologian
1942 – Ole Anderson, American wrestler
  1942   – Candida Lycett Green, Anglo-Irish journalist and author (d. 2014)
  1942   – Rubén Salazar Gómez, Colombian cardinal
  1942   – David Stern, American lawyer and businessman (d. 2020)
1943 – Toni Basil, American singer-songwriter, dancer, and actress
  1943   – Barry Cable, Australian footballer and coach 
  1943   – Paul Hoffert, American keyboard player, composer, and academic 
1944 – Brian Gibson, English director, producer, and screenwriter (d. 2004)
1946 – King Sunny Adé, Nigerian singer-songwriter and guitarist
  1946   – Larry Dierker, American baseball player and manager
1947 – Jo Beverley, English-Canadian author (d. 2016) 
  1947   – David Drewry, English glaciologist and geophysicist
  1947   – Norma McCorvey, American activist (d. 2017)
  1947   – Robert Morace, American author and academic
1948 – Denis Burke, Australian soldier and politician, 6th Chief Minister of the Northern Territory
  1948   – Mark Phillips, English equestrian, trainer, and journalist
1949 – James Cartwright, American general
  1949   – Jim McGinty, Australian lawyer and politician, Attorney-General of Western Australia
1951 – David Coverdale, English singer-songwriter 
  1951   – Mike Graham, American wrestler and promoter (d. 2012)
  1951   – Doug Somers, American wrestler (d. 2017)
1952 – Bob Goodlatte, American lawyer and politician
  1952   – Sukhumbhand Paribatra, Thai political scientist and politician, 15th Governor of Bangkok
  1952   – Américo Rocca, Mexican wrestler
1953 – Richard Fairbrass, English singer-songwriter, musician and producer
  1953   – Ségolène Royal, French politician
1955 – Jeffrey Leonard, American baseball player and coach
1956 – Debby Boone, American singer, actress, and author
  1956   – Doug Wimbish, American singer-songwriter and bass player 
  1956   – Ibrahim Shema, Nigerian lawyer, politician
1957 – Steve Carney, English footballer (d. 2013)
  1957   – Nick Cave, Australian singer-songwriter, author, and actor
  1957   – Johnette Napolitano, American singer-songwriter and bass player
  1957   – Giuseppe Saronni, Italian cyclist and manager
1958 – Andrea Bocelli, Italian singer-songwriter and producer
  1958   – Beth Catlin, American autistic savant
  1958   – Neil Cavuto, American journalist and author
  1958   – Joan Jett, American singer-songwriter, guitarist, producer, and actress 
1959 – Tai Babilonia, American figure skater and talk show host
  1959   – Saul Perlmutter, American astrophysicist, astronomer, and academic, Nobel Prize Laureate
1960 – Scott Baio, American actor
1961 – Vince Coleman, American baseball player
  1961   – Liam Fox, Scottish physician and politician, Secretary of State for Defence
  1961   – Bonnie Hunt, American actress, producer, and talk show host
  1961   – Diane Lemieux, Canadian lawyer and politician
  1961   – Catherine Oxenberg, American actress
  1961   – Michael Torke, American composer
1962 – Martin Crowe, New Zealand cricketer and sportscaster (d. 2016)
1964 – Juha Turunen, Finnish lawyer and politician 
  1964   – Ken Vandermark, American saxophonist and composer
1965 – Dan Bucatinsky, American actor, director, producer, and screenwriter
  1965   – Andrii Deshchytsia, Ukrainian politician and diplomat, Ukrainian Minister of Foreign Affairs
  1965   – Mark Guthrie, American baseball player
  1965   – Robert Satcher, American physician, engineer, and astronaut
1966 – Ruth Jones, Welsh actress, producer, and screenwriter
  1966   – Mike Richter, American ice hockey player
  1966   – Michael Shank, American racing team owner
1967 – Matt Besser, American actor, director, producer, and screenwriter
  1967   – Super Delfin, Japanese wrestler
  1967   – Brian Keene, American novelist
  1967   – Ian Mortimer, English historian and novelist
  1967   – Rickard Rydell, Swedish race car driver
  1967   – Félix Savón, Cuban boxer
1969 – Nicole Bradtke, Australian tennis player and sportscaster
  1969   – Tuomas Kantelinen, Finnish composer and conductor
  1969   – Sue Perkins, English comedian, actress, and radio host
  1969   – Matt Sharp, American singer-songwriter and bass player 
1970 – Gladys Berejiklian, Australian politician, 45th Premier of New South Wales
  1970   – Mike Matheny, American baseball player and manager
  1970   – Mystikal, American rapper and actor
  1970   – Hitro Okesene, New Zealand rugby player and coach
  1970   – Rupert Penry-Jones, English actor
  1970   – Emmanuel Petit, French footballer
1971 – Elizabeth Bear, American author and poet
  1971   – Toomas Krõm, Estonian footballer
  1971   – Luther Reigns, American actor and wrestler
1973 – Yoo Chae-yeong, South Korean singer-songwriter and actress (d. 2014)
  1973   – Stéfan Louw, South African tenor and producer
  1973   – Bob Sapp, American wrestler
1974 – Jenn Colella, American actress and singer
  1974   – Kostas Kaiafas, Cypriot footballer and manager
1975 – Ethan Moreau, Canadian ice hockey player and scout
1976 – David Berkeley, American singer-songwriter and guitarist
  1976   – Mo Collins, American football player and coach (d. 2014)
1978 – Harry Kewell, Australian footballer and coach
1979 – Emilie Autumn, American singer-songwriter, violinist, and poet
  1979   – Phil Waugh, Australian rugby player
1980 – Francesco D'Isa, Italian painter and journalist
  1980   – Svenja Weidemann, German tennis player
1981 – Alexei Ramírez, Cuban baseball player
  1981   – Subaru Shibutani, Japanese singer-songwriter 
  1981   – Ingrid Vetlesen, Norwegian soprano
1982 – Domenic Cassisi, Australian footballer
  1982   – Billie Piper, English actress and singer
  1982   – Maarten Stekelenburg, Dutch footballer
1983 – Kyla, British singer
  1983   – Glenn Loovens, Dutch professional footballer
  1983   – Petr Tatíček, Czech professional ice hockey
  1983   – Tommy Thelin, Swedish footballer
1984 – Ross Jarman, English drummer and songwriter 
  1984   – Thiago Silva, Brazilian footballer
1985 – Matteo Cavagna, Italian footballer
  1985   – Faris Haroun, Belgian footballer
  1985   – Jamie Mackie, Scottish footballer
  1985   – Tatiana Maslany, Canadian actress
  1985   – Ibragim Todashev, Russian-American mixed martial artist (d. 2013)
1987 – Derick Brassard, Canadian ice hockey player
  1987   – Stefan Denifl, Austrian cyclist
  1987   – Tom Felton, English actor
  1987   – Zdravko Kuzmanović, Serbian footballer
1988 – Nikita Andreyev, Russian footballer
1988   – Sana Saeed, Indian actress and model
1989 – Jon Bass, American actor
  1989   – Kim Hyo-yeon, South Korean singer, dancer, and actress
  1989   – Sabine Lisicki, German tennis player
1990 – Denard Robinson, American football player
1991 – Kenny Bromwich, New Zealand rugby league player
1992 – Philip Hindes, English track cyclist
1994 – Carlos Correa, Puerto Rican-American baseball player
1994   – Park Jin-young, South Korean singer, actor, songwriter
1995 – Im Nayeon, South Korean singer
1999 – Kim Yo-han, South Korean singer and actor
1999   – Kim Yoo-jung, South Korean actress
2000 – Louise Christie, British rhythm gymnast
2000   – Stephen Crichton, Samoan rugby league footballer

Deaths

Pre-1600
 189 – He Jin, Chinese general and regent (b. 135)
 530 – Pope Felix IV
 904 – Zhao Zong, emperor of the Tang Dynasty (b. 867)
 967 – Wichmann II, Frankish nobleman
1072 – Ouyang Xiu, Chinese historian, poet, and politician (b. 1007)
1158 – Otto of Freising, German bishop and chronicler (b. c. 1114)
1174 – Uchtred, Lord of Galloway (b. c. 1120)
1253 – Dōgen, Japanese monk and philosopher (b. 1200)
1345 – Henry, 3rd Earl of Lancaster, English politician, Lord High Steward (b. 1281)
1399 – Thomas de Mowbray, 1st Duke of Norfolk, English politician, Earl Marshal of The United Kingdom (b. 1366)
1408 – John VII Palaiologos, Byzantine Emperor (b. 1370)
1457 – Peter II, Duke of Brittany (b. 1418)
1482 – Philibert I, Duke of Savoy (b. 1465)
1520 – Selim I, Ottoman sultan (b. 1465)
1531 – Louise of Savoy, French regent (b. 1476)
1539 – Guru Nanak, Sikh religious leader, founded Sikhism (b. 1469)
1554 – Francisco Vázquez de Coronado, Spanish explorer (b. 1510)
1566 – Johannes Agricola, German theologian and academic (b. 1494)
1576 – Walter Devereux, 1st Earl of Essex (b. 1541)
1598 – Gabriel Spenser, English actor (b. c.1578)

1601–1900
1607 – Alessandro Allori, Italian painter and educator (b. 1535)
1662 – John Biddle, English minister and theologian (b. 1615)
1692 – Martha Corey, American woman accused of witchcraft (b. 1620)
1703 – Vincenzo Viviani, Italian mathematician and physicist (b. 1622)
1756 – Abu l-Hasan Ali I, ruler of Tunisia (b. 1688)
1774 – Pope Clement XIV (b. 1705)
1776 – Nathan Hale, American soldier (b. 1755)
1777 – John Bartram, American botanist and explorer (b. 1699)
1828 – Shaka Zulu, Zulu chieftain and monarch of the Zulu Kingdom (b. 1787)
1852 – William Tierney Clark, English engineer, designed  Hammersmith Bridge (b. 1783)
1872 – Vladimir Dal, Russian lexicographer and linguist (b. 1801)
1873 – Friedrich Frey-Herosé, Swiss lawyer and politician (b. 1801)
1881 – Solomon L. Spink, American lawyer and politician (b. 1831)

1901–present
1914 – Alain-Fournier, French soldier and author (b. 1886)
1919 – Alajos Gáspár, Hungarian-Slovene author and poet (b. 1848)
1933 – Sime Silverman, American journalist and newspaper publisher (b. 1873)
1934 – Cecil Chubb, English barrister and one time owner of Stonehenge (b. 1876)
1935 – Elliott Lewis, Australian politician, 19th Premier of Tasmania (b. 1858)
1952 – Kaarlo Juho Ståhlberg, Finnish lawyer, judge, and politician, 1st President of Finland (b. 1865)
1956 – Frederick Soddy, English chemist and economist, Nobel Prize laureate (b. 1877)
1957 – Soemu Toyoda, Japanese admiral (b. 1885)
1961 – Marion Davies, American actress and comedian (b. 1897)
1969 – Adolfo López Mateos, Mexican politician, 48th President of Mexico (b. 1909)
1973 – Paul van Zeeland, Belgian lawyer, economist, and politician, 38th Prime Minister of Belgium (b. 1893)
1979 – Abul A'la Maududi, Pakistani theologian, Islamic scholar and jurist (b. 1903)
1981 – Harry Warren, American composer and songwriter (b. 1893)
1987 – Hákun Djurhuus, Faroese educator and politician, 4th Prime Minister of the Faroe Islands (b. 1908)
  1987   – Dan Rowan, American actor, comedian, and producer (b. 1922)
1988 – Rais Amrohvi, Pakistani psychoanalyst, scholar, and poet (b. 1914)
1989 – Ambrose Folorunsho Alli, Nigerian academic and politician (b. 1929)
  1989   – Irving Berlin, Russian-born American composer and songwriter (b. 1888)
1992 – Aurelio López, Mexican baseball player (b. 1948)
1993 – Maurice Abravanel, Greek-American pianist and conductor (b. 1903)
1994 – Leonard Feather, English-American pianist, composer, producer, and journalist (b. 1914)
1996 – Ludmilla Chiriaeff, Latvian-Canadian ballerina, choreographer, and director (b. 1924)
  1996   – Dorothy Lamour, American actress and singer (b. 1914)
1999 – George C. Scott, American actor, director, and producer (b. 1927)
2000 – Saburō Sakai, Japanese lieutenant and pilot (b. 1916)
2001 – Isaac Stern, Polish-Ukrainian violinist and conductor (b. 1920)
2002 – Jan de Hartog, Dutch-American author and playwright (b. 1914)
2003 – Gordon Jump, American actor (b. 1932)
  2003   – Hugo Young, English journalist and author (b. 1938)
2004 – Pete Schoening, American mountaineer (b. 1927)
  2004   – Ray Traylor Jr., American professional wrestler better-known as the Big Boss Man (b. 1963)
2006 – Edward Albert, American actor (b. 1951)
  2006   – Carla Benschop, Dutch basketball player and educator (b. 1950)
2007 – ʻAlí-Muhammad Varqá, last Hand of the Cause of God in the Baháʼí Faith (b. 1911)
  2007   – Marcel Marceau, French mime and actor (b. 1923)
2008 – Thomas Dörflein, German zookeeper (b. 1963)
  2008   – Petrus Schaesberg, German painter, historian, and educator (b. 1967)
2009 – Edward Delaney, Irish sculptor (b. 1930)
2010 – Jackie Burroughs, British-born Canadian actress (b. 1939)
2010   – Eddie Fisher, American singer (b. 1928)
  2010   – Vyacheslav Tsaryov, Russian footballer (b. 1971)
2011 – Knut Steen, Norwegian sculptor (b. 1924)
2012 – Hector Abhayavardhana, Sri Lankan theorist and academic (b. 1919)
  2012   – Irving Adler, American mathematician, author, and academic (b. 1913)
  2012   – Juan H. Cintrón García, Puerto Rican businessman and politician, 126th Mayor of Ponce (b. 1919)
  2012   – Grigory Frid, Russian pianist and composer (b. 1915)
  2012   – Jan Hendrik van den Berg, Dutch psychiatrist and academic (b. 1914)
2013 – Gary Brandner, American author and screenwriter (b. 1930)
  2013   – Jane Connell, American actress and singer (b. 1925)
  2013   – David H. Hubel, Canadian-American neurophysiologist and academic, Nobel Prize laureate (b. 1926)
  2013   – Álvaro Mutis, Colombian-Mexican author and poet (b. 1923)
  2013   – Hans Erich Slany, German industrial designer, founded TEAMS Design (b. 1926)
  2013   – Luciano Vincenzoni, Italian screenwriter (b. 1926)
2014 – Fernando Cabrita, Portuguese footballer and manager (b. 1923)
  2014   – Sahana Pradhan, Nepalese politician, Nepalese Minister of Foreign Affairs (b. 1927)
  2014   – Erik van der Wurff, Dutch pianist, composer, and conductor (b. 1945)
  2014   – Hans E. Wallman, Swedish director, producer, and composer (b. 1936)
2015 – Yogi Berra, American baseball player, coach, and manager (b. 1925)
  2015   – James David Santini, American lawyer and politician (b. 1937)
  2015   – Richard G. Scott, American engineer and religious leader (b. 1928)
  2015   – Phyllis Tickle, American author and academic (b. 1934)
2018 – Chas Hodges, English musician and singer (b. 1943)
  2018   – Edna Molewa, South African politician (b. 1957)
  2018   – Mike Labinjo, Canadian football player (b. 1980)
2020 – Neil Brannon, American politician (b. 1940)
2022 – Hilary Mantel, British author (b. 1952)

Holidays and observances
American Business Women's Day (United States)
Baltic Unity Day (Lithuania, Latvia)
Christian feast days:
Candidus
Digna and Emerita
Emmeram of Regensburg
Felix and Constantia
Ignatius of Santhià (Lorenzo Maurizio Belvisotti)
Laud of Coutances
Maurice (Western Christianity)
Paul Chong Hasang (one of The Korean Martyrs)
Phocas (the Gardener, or of Sinope)
Phocas, Bishop of Sinope
Sadalberga
Saintin (Sanctinus) de Meaux
Septimius of Iesi (this date since 1623)
Theban Legion
Thomas of Villanova
Philander Chase (Episcopal Church)
September 22 (Eastern Orthodox liturgics)
Earliest date for the autumnal equinox in the Northern Hemisphere and the vernal equinox in the Southern Hemisphere:
Autumnal Equinox Day (Japan)
Mabon in the Northern Hemisphere, Ostara in the Southern Hemisphere. (Neopagan Wheel of the Year)
The first day of Miķeļi (Latvia)
Independence Day, celebrates the independence of Bulgaria from the Ottoman Empire in 1908.
Independence Day, celebrates the independence of Mali from France in 1960.
Resistance Fighting Day (Estonia)

References

External links

 
 
 

Days of the year
September